is a Japanese football player who last featured for Kataller Toyama.

Club career statistics
Updated to 23 February 2018.

References

External links

Profile at Kataller Toyama

1988 births
Living people
Association football people from Saitama Prefecture
Japanese footballers
J1 League players
J2 League players
J3 League players
Ventforet Kofu players
Sagan Tosu players
Kataller Toyama players
Association football midfielders